Oscar García may refer to:

Politicians
Oscar García Rivera (1900–1969), politician, lawyer and activist

Sportspeople

Footballers
Óscar García (footballer, born 1973), Spanish former football midfielder and manager
Óscar Boniek García (born 1984), Honduran football midfielder
Óscar García (footballer, born 1988), Spanish football striker
Óscar García (footballer, born 1990), Honduran football midfielder
Óscar García (footballer, born 1993), Mexican football defender

Other sports
Oscar García (cyclist) (born 1941), Argentinian cyclist
Oscar García (fencer) (born 1966), Cuban fencer
Óscar García (canoeist) (born 1972), Spanish sprint canoer
Óscar García (basketball) (born 1979), Spanish professional basketball player
Oscar García (volleyball) (born 1995), Venezuelan volleyball player
Oscar García (drummer), former drummer for Falling in Reverse
Oscar Garcia (vocalist), American vocalist for Terrorizer and Nausea